Václav "Vašek" Klouda (born 1986) is a Czech competitive freestyle footbag player. Raised and resident in Prague, in the Czech Republic, Klouda started playing footbag when he was 13. He won his first Footbag World Championship in 2002 in San Francisco, beating the two-time defending champion Ryan Mulroney in the most tightly contested finals ever. He completed a clean sweep by taking first place in the three major freestyle disciplines: 2 Minute Routines, Shred30, and Sick 3. Klouda has since successfully defended his title five times, in Prague in 2003, Montreal in 2004, in Helsinki in 2005, in Frankfurt in 2006, and in Orlando in 2007. He holds the record for most consecutive World Titles (6), as well as total World Titles (7).

In the 2008 IFPA Footbag World Championships, held in Prague, Klouda was beaten by Damian Gielnicki of Poland, ending his bid for a 7th straight world championship.

Bouncing back from 2008, Klouda reclaimed the world title in Berlin, Germany. At the tournament Klouda's first book was launched. The Vašek Klouda Manual: How to Play Footbag is an eBook downloadable from the Czech Footbag Association's homepage.

In Klouda's autobiography he mentions tennis, boxing and tae kwon do. He also talks about his time learning chess and says, "I also had a chance to play against the then world champion Kasparov".

Freestyle Footbag Events

WORLD CHAMPIONSHIPS

 San Francisco, 2002
Winner: Singles Routine

 Prague, 2003 
Winner: Singles Routine, Shred 30, and Doubles Routine

 Montreal, 2004 
Winner: Singles Routine, Shred 30, and Doubles Routine

 Helsinki, 2005 
Winner: Singles Routine, Shred 30, Big 3, and Doubles Routine

 Frankfurt, 2006 
Winner: Singles Routine - 3rd Place: Shred 30

 Florida, 2007 
Winner: Singles Routine, Shred 30, Circle Contest, and Doubles Freestyle

 Prague, 2008 
Winner: Doubles Routine - 2nd Place: Singles Routine - 3rd Place: Request Contest

 Berlin, 2009 
Winner: Singles Routine

 Oakland, 2010 
5th Place: Singles Routine

 Helsinki, 2011
Runner Up: Request Contest  - 5th Place: Singles Routine

 Warsaw, 2012 
4th Place: Singles Routine

 Paris, 2014
Winner: Request Contest  - 2nd Place: Shred 30 and Sick 3 - 3rd Place: Singles Routine - 5th Place: Circle Contest

 Copenhagen, 2015
Winner: Sick 3and Circle Contest - 2nd Place: Shred 30, Request Contest, and Sick Trick - 3rd Place: Singles Routine

 Trnava, 2016
2nd Place: Singles Routine

EUROPEAN CHAMPIONSHIPS
 Prague, 2001. 1st Place
 Budapest, 2002. European champion Footbag
 Frankfurt, 2003. Champion European Footbag
 Copenhagen, 2004. Champion European Footbag
 Warsaw, 2005. Champion European Footbag
 Lausanne, 2006. Champion European Footbag
 Vienna, 2007. Champion European Footbag
 Montpellier, 2008. Champion European Footbag
 Madrid, 2011. Champion European Footbag
 Moscow, 2013. Champion European Footbag
 Turku, 2014. Champion European Footbag
 Sofia, 2015. Champion European in circle, shred, sick3 and request

References

External links
 
 Footbag tournament victories
 Vašek Klouda's Website
 Klouda's book
 
 

1986 births
Living people
Czech footbag players